Anoushka Schut-Welkzijn  (born February 6, 1969 in Delft) is a Dutch politician. As a member of the People's Party for Freedom and Democracy (Volkspartij voor Vrijheid en Democratie) she was an MP between September 20, 2012 and March 23, 2017.

She worked for the Dutch Healthcare Authority (Nederlandse Zorgautoriteit) from 2005 to 2010, and was political assistant to Minister and fellow party member Edith Schippers from 2010 to 2012.

Schut-Welkzijn studied public administration at Erasmus University Rotterdam and economics at Birkbeck, University of London.

References 

1969 births
Living people
Dutch civil servants
Erasmus University Rotterdam alumni
Members of the House of Representatives (Netherlands)
People from Delft
People's Party for Freedom and Democracy politicians
21st-century Dutch politicians
21st-century Dutch women politicians